Edgar Buchwalder (2 August 1916 – 9 April 2009) was a cyclist from  Switzerland. He won the silver medal in the team road race at the 1936 Summer Olympics along with Ernst Nievergelt and Kurt Ott. He was the Swiss National Road Race champion in 1940 and 1942.

References

External links

1916 births
2009 deaths
Swiss male cyclists
Olympic cyclists of Switzerland
Olympic silver medalists for Switzerland
Cyclists at the 1936 Summer Olympics
Olympic medalists in cycling
People from Solothurn
Tour de Suisse stage winners
Medalists at the 1936 Summer Olympics
Sportspeople from the canton of Solothurn